Jaafari may refer to:

Jaʽfari jurisprudence, the Juridical school followed by Twelver and Nizari Shi'a, named after Ja'far al-Sadiq
Al-Ja'fari, a surname commonly associated with descendants of Ja'far al-Sadiq, including notable people with the surname

See also 
 Ja'far al-Sadiq (702-765), holy Sixth Imam for the majority of Shia Muslims
 Jaʽfar, a given name common among Shia Muslims
 Twelver Shi’ism, the largest branch of Shia Islam
 Nizari Isma'ilism, the second largest branch of Shia Islam